Clara Pinedo Castresana (born 9 September 2003) is a Spanish footballer who plays as a midfielder for Athletic Club.

Club career
Pinedo started her career at Athletic Club B.

International career
Pinedo is currently also playing for the Spanish U-19 team, scoring a goal in a 4–0 win against Portugal on 22 October 2021.

References

External links
 
 
 
 

2003 births
Living people
Women's association football midfielders
Spanish women's footballers
Footballers from Bilbao
Athletic Club Femenino B players
Athletic Club Femenino players
Primera División (women) players
Segunda Federación (women) players
Spain women's youth international footballers